Paul James Waring (born 2 February 1985) is an English professional golfer.

Waring was born in Birkenhead. He had a successful amateur career which included winning the English Amateur in 2005. He turned professional in 2007 and almost enjoyed immediate success on the second tier Challenge Tour when he lost out in a playoff to Felipe Aguilar at the Postbank Challenge in Germany. He has since competed on the European Tour after gaining his card at that year's qualifying school.

On the European Tour, Waring finished tied for third place in the 2013 Portugal Masters and the 2015 Maybank Malaysian Open. In February 2017 he had his highest finish on the tour when he was runner-up in the Joburg Open. This event was one of the Open Qualifying Series events for the 2017 Open Championship and he gained an entry to the Open for the first time since 2008. In April, Waring finished third in the Trophée Hassan II.

Waring earned his first European Tour win in his 200th event, the 2018 Nordea Masters at Hills Golf & Sports Club, Gothenburg, Sweden.

Amateur wins
2001 McGregor Trophy
2005 English Amateur

Professional wins (1)

European Tour wins (1)

European Tour playoff record (1–0)

Playoff record
Challenge Tour playoff record (0–1)

Results in major championships
Results not in chronological order in 2020.

 

CUT = missed the half-way cut
"T" = tied
NT = No tournament due to COVID-19 pandemic

Results in World Golf Championships

"T" = Tied

Team appearances
Amateur
European Boys' Team Championship (representing England): 2002, 2003
Jacques Léglise Trophy (representing Great Britain and Ireland): 2002 (winners), 2003 (winners)
 European Youths' Team Championship (representing England): 2004, 2006
European Amateur Team Championship (representing England): 2007

See also
2007 European Tour Qualifying School graduates

References

External links

English male golfers
European Tour golfers
People from Bebington
1985 births
Living people